Kenway may refer to:

Persons
Derek Kenway, English cricketer
Nan Kenway, Australian-British entertainer
Richard Kenway, English cricketer

Fictional characters
Haytham Kenway, from the 2012 video game Assassin's Creed III
Connor Kenway, from the 2012 video game Assassin's Creed III
Edward Kenway, from the 2013 video game Assassin's Creed IV: Black Flag

Other
17046 Kenway, a main-belt asteroid, discovered 1999